Sir Geoffrey Doyne Adams  (born 11 June 1957) served as the British Ambassador to Egypt from 2018 to 2021, as a member of the British Diplomatic Service. He was Ambassador to the Netherlands from 2013 to 2017.

Biography
Adams was educated at Eton College, where he was a King's Scholar, and Magdalen College, Oxford, where he studied Islamic history and Middle Eastern politics. In 1979, he joined the British Diplomatic Service. Adams has been in diplomatic postings overseas in Saudi Arabia, France, South Africa and Egypt. He was the British Consul-General in Jerusalem from 2001 to 2003, responsible for Britain's relations with the Palestinian people, before joining Jack Straw's private office as Principal Private Secretary to the Foreign Secretary. He served as Ambassador to Iran 2006–09 and Director-General, Political at the Foreign and Commonwealth Office (FCO) 2009–12. 

In September 2013 he took up the post of Ambassador to the Netherlands, and concurrently Permanent Representative to the Organisation for the Prohibition of Chemical Weapons which is based in The Hague. In January 2017 the FCO announced that he was to transfer to another Diplomatic Service appointment. He left the Netherlands in August 2017. He was subsequently appointed as the British ambassador to Egypt.

Adams is honorary senior lecturer at the Institute for Iranian Studies at St Andrews University

Adams was appointed a Companion of the Order of St Michael and St George (CMG) in the 2003 New Year Honours, a "Serving Officer" (Member) of the Order of the Hospital of Saint John of Jerusalem (MStJ) in 2006, and a Knight Commander of the Order of St Michael and St George (KCMG) in the 2008 Birthday Honours.

References

External links

Offices held 

1957 births
Living people
People educated at Eton College
Alumni of Magdalen College, Oxford
Members of HM Diplomatic Service
Consuls-General of the United Kingdom to Jerusalem
Principal Private Secretaries to the Secretary of State for Foreign and Commonwealth Affairs
Ambassadors of the United Kingdom to Iran
Ambassadors of the United Kingdom to the Netherlands
Permanent Representatives of the United Kingdom to the Organisation for the Prohibition of Chemical Weapons
Knights Commander of the Order of St Michael and St George
Serving Brothers of the Order of St John
20th-century British diplomats
21st-century British diplomats